Jeffrey B. Pine (born January 10, 1955) was Attorney General of Rhode Island from 1993-1999. Since 1999 he has been in private practice as a trial lawyer in both criminal and civil litigation.
 
Pine spent ten years as a criminal prosecutor in the Rhode Island Department of Attorney General prosecuting dozens of capital cases and high-profile homicides. Following the enactment of Rhode Island's Life Without Parole Statute in 1984, he was the first prosecutor to prosecute a life without parole case, in State of Rhode Island v. Raymond Lassor, who was convicted of three homicides in 1986 and was sentenced to Life Without Parole.
 
Pine was elected Attorney General in 1992 and was overwhelmingly reelected in 1994, receiving 76% of the vote.
 
As Attorney General, Pine established priorities for the Department in the areas of juvenile crime, consumer protection, domestic violence, senior protection, public corruption, health care, and multi-state public interest litigation. He oversaw the successful prosecutions of the Chief Justice of the Rhode Island Supreme Court, Thomas Fay, who was convicted of Ethics Violations; the former Governor of the State of Rhode Island, Edward DiPrete, who was convicted of bribery; four-time serial killer Craig Price; banking crisis figure Joseph Mollicone and notorious killer Christopher Hightower.
 
During his two terms as Attorney General the Department received numerous awards on the state and national level for its successes and achievements, including "The 1997 Elder Initiative Award" presented by the National Association of Attorneys General, recognizing the Department's many achievements in the area of Senior Protection.
 
Pine also was a member of the Executive Committee of the National Association of Attorneys General and served as Chair of the Eastern Region for two years.
 
In 1993  Pine established a statewide Task Force to Prevent Violence in Schools and a Domestic Violence Task Force. He also chaired a Task Force to Prevent the Sexual and Violent Abuse of Children, which led the charge to improve the justice system's treatment of victims of child abuse and sexual assault.
 
He also introduced more than 40 pieces of legislation that were passed on a bipartisan basis in the General Assembly, strengthening the laws in the areas of victim's rights, juvenile justice, domestic abuse, drunk driving and other public safety areas.  Pine published a law review article on Juvenile Crime for the Roger Williams University Law Review and was cited as a national leader in the battle to end Domestic Violence.

Since 1999 Mr. Pine has successfully represented numerous individuals charged in all types of criminal cases at the State and Federal levels. Jeff has achieved both acquittals at trial and favorable resolutions for his clients at both the trial and investigative stages, including, homicide cases, all forms of capital offenses, major felonies and misdemeanors, and has earned a reputation as one of the top attorneys in Rhode Island.

Pine also frequently acts as outside counsel to corporations and businesses in Rhode Island and Massachusetts who find themselves involved in government investigations and prosecutions.

Pine is a graduate of Haverford College and George Washington University Law School.

References

Rhode Island lawyers
1955 births
Living people